Rhodanobacter thiooxydans is a Gram-negative, non-spore-forming and non-motile bacterium from the genus of Rhodanobacter which has been isolated from biofilm from Daejon in Korea.

References

Xanthomonadales
Bacteria described in 2007